Aeroflot Flight 2723 was a Soviet domestic passenger flight from Bina International Airport to Makhachkala Airport. On 23 April 1966 the Ilyushin Il-14 operating the route ditched in the Caspian Sea following engine problems.

Aircraft 
The Ilyushin Il-14P involved was built in 1956 and flew until 1959 registered as CCCP-Л1772 for Aeroflot, before the registration was changed to СССР-61772. By the time of the accident, the aircraft had completed 16,257 flying hours.

Accident 
The Il-14P departed at 07:42 local time from Baku for Saratov with a stopover in Makhachkala. The flight made a 180° turn to return to Baku. Shortly thereafter, the crew reported strong vibrations and low revs from the left engine. 

At 07:59, the crew reported that the temperature had dropped sharply in both engines. However, due to the bad weather, the aircraft had already flown past the airport and was located over the Caspian Sea south of the Absheron Peninsula. Five seconds later, the crew radioed an SOS call and reported that they would ditch the aircraft in the sea. That was the last radio contact with Flight 2723.

Investigation 
The aircraft and most of the bodies of those on board were removed from the water by a floating crane. The fuselage had little significant damage, indicating that the aircraft hit the water at a shallow angle and remained relatively intact. The investigation was unable to find the cause of the engine failures.

See also 
 List of previously missing aircraft

References

External links 
 Accident description at the Aviation Safety Network

Aviation accidents and incidents in 1966
Accidents and incidents involving the Ilyushin Il-14
2723
Pages with unreviewed translations
Airliner accidents and incidents involving ditching
Airliner accidents and incidents caused by engine failure